Plikiai is a town in Samogitia, Lithuania.

References

Towns in Klaipėda County
Towns in Lithuania